William Armstrong and its variations may refer to:

Politicians
 William Armstrong (corn merchant) (1778–1857), local politician and corn merchant
 Bill Armstrong (Australian politician) (1909–1982), member of the Parliament of Australia
 Billy Armstrong (born 1941), politician in Northern Ireland
 William Armstrong (Virginia politician) (1782–1865), U.S. Representative from Virginia
 William Armstrong, Baron Armstrong of Sanderstead (1915–1980), British civil servant
 William Boardman Armstrong (1883–1954), lawyer and political figure in Nova Scotia, Canada
 William Drayton Armstrong (1862–1936), member of the Queensland Legislative Assembly
 William H. Armstrong (Wisconsin politician) (died 1916), Wisconsin legislator
 William Hepburn Armstrong (1824–1919), U.S. Representative from Pennsylvania
 William James Armstrong (1826–1915), merchant, miller and politician in British Columbia
 William L. Armstrong (1937–2016), U.S. Senator from Colorado
 William Armstrong (Tennessee politician) (1795–1847), mayor of Nashville, Tennessee
 William W. Armstrong (journalist) (1833–1905), American journalist and politician from Ohio
 William W. Armstrong (politician) (1864–1944), American lawyer and politician in New York state

Artists
 William Armstrong (Canadian artist) (1822–1914), Canadian artist
 Bill Armstrong (photographer), American fine art photographer

Sports
 Bill Armstrong (announcer) (1932–2000), game show announcer
 Bill Armstrong (Australian footballer) (born 1936), former Australian rules footballer
 Bill Armstrong (coach) (1873–1938), American college football coach
 Bill Armstrong (English footballer) (1913–1995), English footballer
 Bill Armstrong (guard) (1920–1976), American football player
 Bill Armstrong (defensive back) (born 1955), American football player
 Bill Armstrong (ice hockey, born 1966), ice hockey player
 Bill Armstrong (ice hockey, born 1970), ice hockey player, coach, and executive
 William Armstrong (cricketer) (1885–1955), Australian cricketer
 William Armstrong (footballer) (1892–1968), Australian rules footballer
 William Armstrong (rugby league), rugby league footballer of the 1920s

Music
 William Armstrong (music critic) (1858–1942), American music critic
 Billie Joe Armstrong (born 1972), American rock musician with Green Day
 Willie Armstrong (1804–?), Newcastle upon Tyne-born singer-songwriter

Others
 William Armstrong (Christie's Will) (c. 1602–c. 1658), Scottish border freebooter, known as "Christie's Will"
 William Armstrong, 1st Baron Armstrong (1810–1900), British industrialist
 William "Duff" Armstrong (William Armstrong, 1833–1899), 1858 defendant for the murder of James Preston Metzker in Mason County, Illinois
 William H. Armstrong (author) (1911–1999), author of the children's book Sounder
 William Nevins Armstrong (1835–1905), Attorney General of Hawaii 
 William Armstrong (pilot) (1924–1945), member of the Tuskegee Airmen
 William T. Armstrong (1929–2005), Canadian Broadcasting Corporation executive
 William Ward Armstrong, Canadian mathematician and computer scientist
 William Park Armstrong (1874–1944), theologian and New Testament scholar
 William Armstrong (theatre director) (1882–1952), British actor, theatre manager and director
 Billy Armstrong (actor) (1891–1924), British actor
 William Goodfellow Armstrong (1792–1879), English-born Upper Canadian farmer, soldier, hotelier and settler of Markham Village, Ontario